Sumy (U209) was a Grisha I-class anti-submarine corvette of the Ukrainian Navy. Prior to joining the Ukrainian Navy she was a former Soviet Navy corvette named MPK-43 and later Odesskiy Komsomolets.

Development and design 

The 1124P project corvette (NATO reporting name: Grisha I class, Soviet classification: MPK-147 class ) were intended to counter enemy submarines in nearby area of ​​naval bases, ports and scattered berths, on the deployment of naval forces to carry out anti-submarine surveillance and protection of ships and vessels at sea.

Project 1124 of the first series were armed with SAM Osa-M in the bow of the hull. One twin AK-725 gun was located in the stern. Control of firing AK-725 was carried out by the MR-103 Leopard radar with a maximum detection range of 40 km, which was also located on the stern superstructure. The MR-302 Rubka radar was installed as a radar for detecting air and surface targets on the ship's mast. The basis of the sonar consisted of submersible GAS MG-322 Argun (operated in echo direction-finding mode) and lowered GAS MG-339 Shelon in the stern superstructure, which operated only in the "stop" mode. The basis of anti-submarine weapons were located two twin torpedo tubes for DTA-5E-1124 and two RBU-6000 on the bow of the ship's superstructure.

Construction of small anti-submarine ships on Project 1124 began in 1967 at the Zelenodolsk Shipyard. A total of twelve ships of this project were built, after which they were replaced by the corvettes of Project 1124 of the second series (Grisha-III according to NATO reporting name).

Construction and career 
The corvette MPK-43 was laid down on 1 August 1972 at the Zelenodolsk Shipyard, Zelenodolsk. The ship was launched on 2 June 1973. The corvette was commissioned on 28 December 1974 and by the order of the Commander-in-Chief of the Navy on 23 January 1975, MPK-43 was enlisted in the Black Sea Fleet.

The corvette was a member of the 400th division of anti-submarine ships of the 68th brigade of ships of the Black Sea Fleet, which took an active part in training and combat activities of the fleet. MPK-43 served in the Mediterranean, sailing more than 43,000 miles. As part of the ship's anti-submarine strike groups, the ship won the prize of the Chief of the USSR Navy four times  for anti-submarine training (the last in 1989).

During the receipt of the ships of the Black Sea Fleet of the USSR, the Ukrainian Navy reached a state of non-combat readiness. Like sister ship Kherson, due to lack of funds for repairs to bring the ship in order failed and immediately after joining the Navy, the ship was written off and disposed of.

Pennant numbers

References 

Grisha-class corvettes
Sumy
1973 ships
Sumy
Ships built in the Soviet Union